A City Called Macau  is a 2019 Chinese drama film directed by Li Shaohong, and starring Bai Baihe, Huang Jue, Carina Lau and Wu Gang. It was released on December 12, 2018.

Synopsis
Macau's return to Chinese sovereignty in 1999 ushered in that city's "golden age." By 2012, the value of Macau's gaming industry was nine times that of Las Vegas, and Macao had become the world's foremost gambling destination. During this period, a unique profession arose: "casino brokers," who provided Macao's gamblers with high-interest lines of credit, under-the-table bets, and other services. It was a high-stakes, high-reward business that made for more thrilling play, but amplified the risks for players, brokers and casinos alike. This heightened risk made gambling more exciting and more dangerous for the participants; it also impacted their interpersonal relationships and outlook on life. It was as if everyone involved were walking on a tightrope. By 2014, however, China's ongoing anti-corruption campaign had dealt a serious blow to the gaming industry in Macao, ending the golden age. This is the background against which our story takes place.

Cast
 Bai Baihe as Mei Xiaoou
 Huang Jue as Shi Qilan
 Wu Gang as Duan Kaiwen
 Carina Lau as Sister Faye
  Tian Liang as Boss Liu
 Samuel Pang as Brother Wah
 Chin Siu-ho
 Wei Lu as Xiao Xiao
 Geng Le as Lu Jintong
 Yu Xiaotong as little brother Yang
 Su Xiaoming as Yu Jiaying
 Hu Xianxu as Le Le
 Eric Tsang as Lao Seung
 Darren Grosvenor as Blackjack Player

References

External links
 

2018 films
Chinese drama films
Films set in Macau